Baron Dmitry Gustavovich Fyolkerzam (tr. ; 29 April 1846 – 24 May 1905), better known as Baron Dmitry Gustavovich von Fölkersahm, was a Russian admiral of Baltic German descent who served in the Imperial Russian Navy.

Biography
The family was part of the Uradels. They had a long history of service to the Russian Empire. His father Gustav Johann Georg von Fölkersahm was a general in the Imperial Russian Army and his grandfather Jakob Joachim von Fölkersahm was managing director of the Tula Arsenal. His family was originally Lutheran, including his father Gustav, but because of Gustav von Fölkersahm’s marriage to a Russian Orthodox woman, his children, including Dmitry, were raised in the Orthodox Church.

Fölkersam entered the Naval Cadet Corps in 1860, graduating at the top of his class in 1867. Promoted to lieutenant in 1871, he served as a gunnery officer aboard the ironclad  in 1883. He joined the  September 1884 to September 1887. On 26 February 1885 he was promoted to captain, 2nd rank. In 1891 he was appointed commanding officer of the clipper Dzhigit and was promoted to captain, 1st rank on 1 January 1893. He was promoted to rear admiral on 6 December 1899. From February 1900, Fölkersahm headed a commission to improve the state of naval artillery, and two years later became commandant of the naval gunnery school for the Russian Baltic Fleet in St. Petersburg.

During the Russo-Japanese War, Fölkersam was appointed commander of the 2nd battleship division of the 2nd Pacific Squadron, with the battleship  as his flagship. The squadron departed the Baltic Sea on 15 October 1904 under the command of Admiral Zinovy Rozhestvensky on a voyage around the southern tip of Africa, across the Indian Ocean and north to the Tsushima Straits in an attempt to relieve the Japanese blockade of Port Arthur. Fölkersam was already seriously ill with cancer. Rozhestvensky was aware of Fölkersam's condition, and when the fleet reached Tangier, he assigned Fölkersahm to an independent command consisting of five older warships and several transports, which transited the Suez Canal and rejoined the main fleet at Nossi Be in Madagascar.  However, Fölkersam was incapacitated from early April 1905. On 24 May 1905, shortly before reaching the Sea of Japan, he died. Rozhestvensky, concerned with the effect of Fölkersam's death on morale, ordered that the news be kept secret from the crew and the rest of the fleet. Fölkersam's body was placed in the cold store of the ship, and his flag was kept flying on the Oslyabya. During the Battle of Tsushima three days later, Oslyabya was the first ship to be sunk by the Imperial Japanese Navy, and Fölkersam's body went down with his ship.

Awards and decorations
 Silver Life Saving Medal (10 October 1869)
 Gold Life Saving Medal (8 November 1874)
 Order of Saint Stanislaus, 2nd class (15 May 1883), previously 3rd class (6 August 1873)
 Gold Life Saving Medal with a bow (22 September 1885) to save the drowning sailor overboard 2 April 1885 during the Nagasaki raid
 Order of the Rising Sun, 3rd class (Japan, 9 July 1891)
 Order of St. Vladimir, 3rd class (30 October 1895); previously 4th class (22 September 1887)
 Order of St. Anna, 1st class (6 December 1904); previously 2nd class (1 January 1890) and 3rd class (1 January 1881)
Order of Prince Danilo I, 2nd class (Montenegro), (1897)

References

Notes

1846 births
1905 deaths
Latvian emigrants to Russia
Baltic-German people
Russian people of German descent
Imperial Russian Navy admirals
Russian military personnel of the Russo-Japanese War
Recipients of the Order of the Rising Sun, 3rd class
Recipients of the Order of St. Vladimir, 3rd class
Recipients of the Order of St. Anna, 1st class
Deaths from cancer in Russia
Naval Cadet Corps alumni